Rathconrath is a village in County Westmeath, Ireland.

Rathconrath is also one of the baronies in Co. Westmeath, see list of baronies of Ireland.

Public transport
Bus Éireann route 448 provides a link to Ballynacargy and Mullingar on Fridays only. The nearest railway station is Mullingar railway station.

See also
 List of towns and villages in Ireland

Towns and villages in County Westmeath